1534 Näsi, provisional designation , is a carbonaceous asteroid from the middle region of the asteroid belt, approximately 20 kilometers in diameter.

It was discovered on 20 January 1939, by Finnish astronomer Yrjö Väisälä at Turku Observatory in Southwest Finland, and later named for the Finnish lake Näsijärvi.

Orbit and classification 

Näsi orbits the Sun in the central main-belt at a distance of 2.0–3.4 AU once every 4 years and 6 months (1,646 days). Its orbit has an eccentricity of 0.25 and an inclination of 10° with respect to the ecliptic.

Physical characteristics

Lightcurve observations 

In April 2007, the so-far best rated rotational lightcurve of Näsi was obtained by Jason Sauppe at Oakley Observatory in the United States. The lightcurve analysis gave a rotation period of 7.94 hours with a brightness variation of 0.35 magnitude.

Periods from other photometric observations were obtained by astronomers René Roy in May 2016 (5.98 hours, Δ0.47 mag), Giovanni de Sanctis in the 1990s (9.75 hours, Δ0.22 mag), Adrián Galád in October 2005 (7.9338 hours, Δ0.51 mag), and a period of 7.93161 hours modeled from various data sources and published in 2016.

Spectral type, diameter and albedo 

In the SMASS taxonomy, the carbonaceous C-type asteroid is also classified as a Cgh-subtype. According to the surveys carried out by the Infrared Astronomical Satellite IRAS, the Japanese Akari satellite, and NASA's Wide-field Infrared Survey Explorer with its subsequent NEOWISE mission, Näsi measures between 18.32 and 27.52 kilometers in diameter and its surface has an albedo between 0.035 and 0.100. The Collaborative Asteroid Lightcurve Link derives an albedo of 0.0721 and a diameter of 22.11 kilometers based on an absolute magnitude of 11.75.

Naming 

This minor planet is named for the large Finnish lake Näsijärvi, sometimes called "Näsi". It measures 256 square kilometers (99 sq mi) in size and is located only 95 metres above sea level. The official  was published by the Minor Planet Center on 20 February 1976.

References

External links 
 Asteroid Lightcurve Database (LCDB), query form (info )
 Dictionary of Minor Planet Names, Google books
 Asteroids and comets rotation curves, CdR – Observatoire de Genève, Raoul Behrend
 Discovery Circumstances: Numbered Minor Planets (1)-(5000) – Minor Planet Center
 
 

001534
Discoveries by Yrjö Väisälä
Named minor planets
001534
19390120